Zhang Ze (born July 4, 1990), is a Chinese male tennis player. 

Zhang's career highlights include reaching the quarterfinals of the 2012 China Open (defeating Richard Gasquet en route), playing the Australian Open main draw in two consecutive years (2014 and 2015), and teaming up with Roger Federer to play doubles at the 2013 Shanghai Rolex Masters.

Career
Zhang's early years were spent on the ITF Circuit throughout Asia. In February 2008, Zhang made his first appearance in the qualifying draw of an ATP Challenger tournament in Melbourne, defeating Mikal Statham (5–7, 7–5, 6–4). In the second round, Zhang lost to Nima Roshan (6–7(6–8), 1–6).

On 28 March 2010, Zhang won the first single's title of his professional career in an ITF Futures event in Mengzi City, China. He defeated Riccardo Ghedin (6–1, 6–4). Just under two months later, on 22 May, Zhang reached his first final on the Challenger Tour in Fergana, Uzbekistan, after entering as a qualifier. He lost to Evgeny Kirillov (6–3, 2–6, 6–2).

In 2010, Zhang became, for the first time in his career, Chinese champion in both singles and doubles of the QuanYunHui. He was selected to play for China’s Davis Cup team.

On 22 May 2011, exactly a year to the day of his first final on the Challenger Tour, Zhang won his second ITF single's title by defeating Lee Hsin-han (6–1, 6–0) in Guiyang, China.

He played the qualifying rounds at the 2012 Wimbledon, and the 2012 US Open, where he made it to the second round but lost.

In the 2012 China Open, Zhang defeated world No.14 Richard Gasquet 6–4, 3–6, 6–4 in the second round, before he lost to Florian Mayer on the following day.

In October 2013, Zhang teamed up with Roger Federer at the 2013 Shanghai Rolex Masters. They beat Kevin Anderson and Dmitry Tursunov, 6–2, 6–1. However, the pair were defeated in the second round.

In January 2014, Zhang qualified in men's singles for the 2014 Australian Open, his first grand slam tournament. In the first round he lost to world No. 33 and 31-seed Fernando Verdasco in four sets: 7–5, 3–6, 2–6, 3–6.

In January 2015, 187-ranked Zhang earned one of eight wildcards to the 2015 Australian Open men's singles main draw. Zhang was the highest-ranked men's singles player from China at the time and was the only China representative in men's singles, men's doubles, and mixed doubles (male). In singles he lost in the first round to unseeded Australian two-time Grand Slam winner Lleyton Hewitt, ranked 87 in the world at the time, in four sets: 3–6, 6–1, 0–6, 4–6. In men's doubles, Zhang and partner Lee Hsin-han of Taiwan were given a wildcard to the main draw and faced number 2 seeds Julien Benneteau and Édouard Roger-Vasselin of France in the first round and lost in straight sets 1–6, 4–6. In mixed doubles, Zhang and partner Chang Kai-Chen of Taiwan were given a wildcard to the main draw and they advanced to the second round.

In October 2015, Zhang was one of three players to receive a wildcard into the main draw of the China Open. After upsetting Denis Istomin in the first round (6–3, 1–6, 6–3), Zhang was defeated by world No.1 and defending champion Novak Djokovic (6–2, 6–1), who went on to win the tournament for the sixth time. Despite a comfortable win for Djokovic, he heaped praise on the youngster, saying he has "Top 100 stuff."

Challenger and Futures finals

Singles: 26 (10–16)

Doubles: 36 (16–20)

References

External links
 
 
 

1990 births
Living people
Chinese male tennis players
Sportspeople from Nanjing
Tennis players at the 2010 Asian Games
Tennis players at the 2014 Asian Games
Tennis players at the 2018 Asian Games
Asian Games medalists in tennis
Asian Games silver medalists for China
Asian Games bronze medalists for China
Medalists at the 2014 Asian Games
Tennis players from Jiangsu